Parson's Brook is a minor river (brook) located in the Horsham District of West Sussex, England. It is a tributary to the River Adur.

Course 
The brook rises in the hamlet of Barns Green, in the civil parish of Itchingfield, and flows south-west, passing multiple farmsteads, before flowing north-west around Brooks Green in the civil parish of Shipley, after which the brook flows into the River Adur.

References 

Rivers of West Sussex